The Benefit of Clergy Act 1496, formally referred to as the Act 12 Hen. 7 c.7, was an Act of the Parliament of England, passed during the reign of Henry VII of England. Its long title was "An Act to make some Offences Petty Treason." It abolished benefit of clergy for petty treason.

See also
High treason in the United Kingdom

References

External links
 

Treason in England
Acts of the Parliament of England (1485–1603)
1490s in law
1496 in England
English criminal law